A referendum on holding separate negotiations on their future status was held in the Marshall Islands part of the Trust Territory of the Pacific Islands on 30 July 1977. The proposal was approved by 62% of voters.

Results
Voters were asked the question "Be it resolved that the Marshall Islands should pursue their future political status separate and apart from the other districts of the Trust Territory. Yes or no."

References

1977 referendums
1977 in the Marshall Islands
1977